The 2021 Judo Grand Slam Antalya was held at the Antalya Arena in Antalya, Turkey from 1 to 3 April 2021.

Medal summary

Men's events

Source Results

Women's events

Source Results

Medal table

Event videos
The event will air freely on the IJF YouTube channel.

References

External links
 
 Results

2021 IJF World Tour
2021 Judo Grand Slam
Judo
Grand Slam 2021
Judo
Judo